John Bryant (August 10, 1916 – July 13, 1989) was a prolific American actor active from 1944 through 1969. He performed in the famous G.I. version of Hamlet, both in the Central Pacific Theater during World War II and later on Broadway. He also acted in films, but was most prevalent on television, playing many lead and character parts including a five-year recurring role as Dr. Carl Spalding on The Virginian.

Early life
He was born Charles Briton Yonts, Jr. in Dixon, Illinois on August 10, 1916. His parents were C. B. Yonts, Sr. and Mary E. Monaghan. His father, a power company manager, moved the family to LaCrosse, Wisconsin while Bryant was still a toddler. By 1930, the family had moved again, to Milwaukee, where his father was now president of an electric utility company. Bryant appears to have been an only child.

He attended Washington High School in Milwaukee. In September 1934, at age 18, he arrived at the Port of New York from Hamburg, Germany. The reason for this trip is not known, but having been made at the height of the Great Depression, points up the comfortable circumstances of his upbringing.

Bryant applied for his social security card in March 1938 under his birth name. He was still living at home in April 1940 when the US Federal Census for that year showed him as having completed three years of college. In October 1940, he registered for the draft, giving his parent's home in Milwaukee as his address while indicating he was a student at the School of the Art Institute of Chicago. The draft registrar recorded him as being 6'1" (185.4 cm), 165 pounds (74.8 kg), with black hair, blue eyes, and a slight scar under his right eye.

Military service
Bryant enlisted in the US Army at Milwaukee, under his birth name, in August 1941. His enlistment papers noted he was married, had completed three years of college, his civil occupation was "Actor", but recorded a much lower height, 5'10" (177.8 cm), and weight, 156 pounds (70.7 kg).

By May 1944 he was a first lieutenant, in a Hawaiian-based Army Entertainment Section attached to the Signal Corps. (Performers assigned to these units were often given officer rank if they had some college or formal professional training). The unit to which Bryant was assigned was commanded by Major Maurice Evans, one of the foremost interpreters of Shakespeare on the pre-war American stage.

During October 1944, Bryant played Horatio to Evans title role in a famous G.I. version of Hamlet. Reviewer Edna B. Lawson said "Capt. C.B. Yonts portrayed Horatio with quietness, strength, and poise". The production was performed for both military and civilian audiences in Hawaii during October and November 1944 then taken on tour to bases throughout the Central Pacific region for the remainder of the war.

Early career
The "G.I. Hamlet" was so successful that following the war's end Michael Todd decided to mount a Broadway revival, with Maurice Evans reprising the title role. Bryant, on terminal leave from the Army, flew from Hawaii to New York in November 1945 to audition and was given the part of Francisco. Notably, the newspaper reporting this identified him as "Capt. John Bryant". For both the one week tryout in Boston and the four-month run on Broadway his billing was John Bryant. There is no public record of him ever using his birth name again.

From April 1946 to November 1950 there is a gap in the record of Bryant's performing career. He may have been doing regional theater for which no record is available, or perhaps switched to other employment. An internet obituary mentions him attending UCLA; he may very well have used his G.I. Bill benefits for this, despite his earlier college attendance. The 1950 US Census records him as living in a rooming house in Los Angeles, working part-time as a bus boy in a restaurant. Later that same year he began getting uncredited bit parts in films at several different movie studios. The first one released was Dial 1119, followed in 1951 by four more minor films.

With 1952 Bryant's career began to blossom. He had his first credited film role in Red Snow, his first known television roles on episodes of Big Town and The Lone Ranger, and played the lead in an original play Willow Whistle at the Laguna Beach Playhouse. Bryant was cast as a psychopathic killer in another original production, Nightshade, at the Pasadena Playhouse in March 1953, for which he received high praise from the Los Angeles Times critic.

Bryant had a minor uncredited part in From Here to Eternity. He returned to summer stock at Laguna Beach in July 1953 with a co-star role in Lo and Behold. He did another original play, Music in the Distance, at Laguna in September 1953, in which he most favorably impressed the reviewer.

Television and film 1954-1958
With 1954 the focal point of Bryant's performances swung permanently to television, while his film career remained negligible, a string of uncredited bit parts. He did a dozen TV episodes that year, including three for The Loretta Young Show, and two for Schlitz Playhouse of Stars. He also handled leading roles in three week-long productions at the Laguna Beach Playhouse during the summer. The following year he had fourteen appearances on television, all but three for anthology series. He also performed on stage in My Three Angels for a weeklong run in Phoenix.

For 1956 Bryant again did fourteen episodes of television, a large number for any actor not playing a regular on a series. For most of these appearances he was either the lead or a featured performer. His tally of TV episodes dipped slightly in 1957, as he had a flurry of film roles that year. Three were uncredited, one was a short subject, but Courage of Black Beauty marked his first lead film role. The following year he had his second lead film role, albeit for an independent Christian-themed production with a limited distribution, I'll Give My Life. He also did nearly a dozen television episodes in 1958, and the play Dream Girl.

Television and film 1959-1962
By 1959 anthology shows share of television had diminished in favor of narrative series with continuing casts. Bryant also rode this trend, doing three episodes of Perry Mason, playing a different character on each. He did six other television shows that year, as well as a film,  The Bat.

His only other film role of consequence during this period was as a neglectful husband to Kim Novak in Strangers When We Meet. His mainstay was television; he did twenty-five episodes on nearly as many series from 1960 through 1962.

The Virginian and later television
Beginning in 1963 Bryant had a long-running recurring role on the top-rated series The Virginian. For five years he played Dr. Carl Spalding in this 90-minute western, performing in two dozen episodes.  He had other television work during these years, appearing on Dr. Kildare, The Man from U.N.C.L.E., My Three Sons, Run for Your Life, Dragnet 1967, and The Mod Squad among others. During the fall of 1969 he appeared in the pilot episode of a new series called The New People. This was his last screen performance for nearly twenty years, until he appeared in a single episode of Highway to Heaven during early 1988. However, he continued to act in stage productions in the Southern California area, and had completed a run in Very Nearly a Pinter just two months before his death from cancer on July 13, 1989.

Personal life
While studying at the Art Institute of Chicago, Bryant met a model named Janet Remick, who was from Massachusetts. They were married in 1941, and initially lived with Bryant's parents in Milwaukee. The couple had a daughter Brittony in 1942, but divorced in 1946.

Stage performances

Filmography

Television performances

Notes

References

1916 births
1989 deaths
20th-century American male actors
American television actors
American film actors
American stage actors
School of the Art Institute of Chicago alumni
University of California, Los Angeles alumni
United States Army personnel of World War II